The Beneteau Oceanis 281 is a French sailboat, that was designed by Groupe Finot and first built in 1995.

The Oceanis 281 is a development of the Beneteau First 265.

Production
The design was built by Beneteau in France and the United States starting in 1995, with 331 boats completed when production ended.

Design

The Oceanis 281 is a recreational keelboat, built predominantly of fiberglass. It has a masthead sloop rig, a slightly raked stem, a reverse transom, an internally-mounted spade-type rudder controlled by a wheel or tiller, and has a fixed fin keel with a weighted bulb. It displaces  and carries  of ballast.

See also
List of sailing boat types

Related development
Beneteau First 265

Similar sailboats
Aloha 28
Beneteau First 285
Cal 28
Catalina 28
Grampian 28
O'Day 28
Pearson 28
Sabre 28
Sirius 28
Tanzer 8.5
Tanzer 28
TES 28 Magnam
Viking 28

References

External links

Keelboats
1990s sailboat type designs
Sailing yachts
Sailboat types built by Beneteau
Sailboat type designs by Groupe Finot